Tom Yuill was the second man on the Avondale Heather CC (from Strathaven, Scotland) during the World Curling Championships known as the 1960 Scotch Cup, where Scottish team won silver medal. The team won The Rink Championship in 1960.

References 

People from Strathaven
Scottish male curlers
Date of birth missing (living people)
Sportspeople from South Lanarkshire
Living people
Year of birth missing (living people)